A Dark, Dark Man (translit. Chornyy, chornyy chelovek) is a 2019 Kazakhstani crime drama film directed by Adilkhan Yerzhanov. It has received the Asia Pacific Screen Award for Achievement in Directing in 2019, and also was shown on the 67th San Sebastián International Film Festival.

Plot 
A little boy is murdered in the village of Karatas. The investigation is entrusted to a young detective named Bekzat, although local criminal bosses indicate they do not want the investigation to progress, with the police already finding a suspect - an intellectually disabled man named Pukuar, whom Bekzat is tasked to kill.

However, a journalist named Ariana soon arrives in Karatas to observe the investigation, ruining Bekzat's plans. She points out that this is the fourth such murder, and previous victims had similar traits - they are small orphan boys; she does not believe that Pukuar could be the murderer and has Bekzat actually investigate the murder.

Unwillingly going deeper into the investigation, Bekzat understands that the murderer is actually one of the local criminal kingpins, who then murders the chief of police and tells Bekzat to tie up loose ends, with Ariana eventually beaten up and framed of drug possession, however, Bekzat has changed, and eventually decides to leave Pukuar and his friend at his friend's house in the mountains for their safety, then going on a killing spree. He shoots two corrupt policemen in the countryside, then massacres everybody responsible for the murder in the police station, himself getting gravely injured. Ariana, along with a film crew, later comes to the police station, finding Bekzat, who has succumbed to his injuries.

Cast 

 Daniar Alshinov as Bekzat
 Dinara Baktybayeva as Ariana
 Teoman Khos as Pukuar
 Adema Yerzhanova as Adema
 Yerken Gubashev as the Man in Black
 Nurbek Mukushev as Chief of Police

Reception 
Ben Kenigsberg from The New York Times praised the film, describing it as "grim revelations with breathtaking rapidity". The reviewer also stated that the mystery element was "handled obliquely". Reviewing from Variety, Jessica Kiang praised A Dark, Dark Man as a "twisted film" that was "gratifyingly self-aware, an ironic and knowing transposition of urban crime thriller archetypes".

References 

2019 films
Kazakhstani crime drama films
2019 crime drama films
Films shot in Kazakhstan
Films set in Kazakhstan
2010s Russian-language films
Kazakh-language films
2019 multilingual films